Maclurodendron is a plant genus in the family Rutaceae. It was first described in 1982 by Thomas Gordon Hartley.

It consists of six evergreen tree species in particular native to Vietnam, China, Peninsular Malaysia, and Borneo. They are dioecious. The leaves are opposite and the leave blade is 1-foliolate. The inflorescences can be axillary, thyrsoid or racemose. The four sepals are connated on the basis. The four petals are imbricated in the bud. The eight stamens are distinct. The opposite sepals are almost as long as the petals which are in male and in female flowers.

Species
Maclurodendron magnificum
Maclurodendron obovatum
Maclurodendron oligophlebium
Maclurodendron parviflorum
Maclurodendron porteri
Maclurodendron pubescens

Maclurodendron obovatum, Maclurodendron oligophlebium, and Maclurodendron porteri were formerly classified by Joseph Dalton Hooker and Elmer Drew Merrill into the genus Acronychia. Maclurodendron pubescens and Maclurodendron parviflorum are listed as vulnerable in the IUCN Red List.

References

External links 
Description of the genus Maclurodendron
Twig and leaf illustration of Maclurodendron porteri

 
Zanthoxyloideae genera
Dioecious plants